Sde Yitzhak (lit. Field of Yitzhak) is a moshav in northern Israel. Located in the eastern Sharon plain to the south-east of Hadera, it falls under the jurisdiction of Menashe Regional Council.

History
The village was established in 1952 on the former site of Lahavot Haviva, which had moved to its present location three kilometres east the previous year. The founders were immigrants from Poland. The moshav was named after Yitzhak Sadeh, a founder of the Palmach.

References

External links
Official website

Moshavim
Populated places established in 1952
Populated places in Haifa District
Polish-Jewish culture in Israel
1952 establishments in Israel